Jill McKee Pohlman is an American lawyer from Utah who serves as the as a justice of the Utah Supreme Court. From 2016 to 2022, she was an associate presiding judge of the Utah Court of Appeals.

Education 

Pohlman was born in Ogden, Utah and attended Alta High School She received a Bachelor of Science from the University of Utah. She received a Juris Doctor from the S.J. Quinney College of Law,. where she graduated Order of the Coif and was a member of the Utah Law Review.

Legal career 

Pohlman served as a law clerk for Chief Judge David Kent Winder of the United States District Court for the District of Utah and the U.S. Attorney's office. She was a partner at the law firm of Stoel Rives in both their litigation and appellate practice groups. One of her high profile cases included the ethics investigation of the 2002 Winter Olympics.

Judicial career

Utah Court of Appeals 

In 2016, Pohlman was appointed as a judge of the Utah Court of Appeals by Utah Governor Gary Herbert. She filled the seat left by the retirement of judge James Davis. She assumed office in May 2016. In August 2017, she became part of a female majority on the court of appeals.

Utah Supreme Court 

On May 20, 2022, Pohlman was one of seven candidates recommended by the appellate judicial nominating commission. On June 28, 2022, Governor Spencer Cox announced the appointment of Pohlman to serve as a justice of the Utah Supreme Court to fill the vacancy of Thomas R. Lee who retired on July 31, 2022. On July 26, 2022, her nomination was unanimously advanced out of the Utah Senate Judicial Confirmation Committee. On August 17, 2022, her nomination was unanimously confirmed by the Utah Senate. With her confirmation, Pohlman brings the Utah Supreme Court to a female majority. She had a formal investiture on January 27, 2023.

References

External links 

Living people
Year of birth missing (living people)
20th-century American women lawyers
20th-century American lawyers
21st-century American judges
21st-century American women judges
21st-century American women lawyers
21st-century American lawyers
Justices of the Utah Supreme Court
People from Ogden, Utah
S.J. Quinney College of Law alumni
Utah Court of Appeals judges
Utah lawyers
University of Utah alumni